Cyanoethylation is a process for the attachment of CH2CH2CN group to another organic substrate. The method is used in the synthesis of organic compounds.

Cyanoethylation entails addition of protic nucleophiles to acrylonitrile.  Typical protic nucleophiles are alcohols, thiols, and amines.  Two new bonds form: C-H and C-X (X = carbon, nitrogen, sulfur, phosphorus, etc):

The β-carbon atom that is furthest from the nitrile group is positively polarized and therefore binds the heteroatom on the nucleophile. Acrylonitrile is a Michael acceptor. The reaction is normally catalyzed by a base.

Cyanethylation is used to prepared numerous commercial chemicals.  Detailed laboratory procedures are available for several variants of this reaction.
Cyanoethylation of amines.
Cyanoethylation of phosphines.
Cyanoethylation of carbon nucleophiles.  In one commercial example, acetone is cyanoethylated to give the keto hexanenitrile, a precursor to 2-methylpyridine.

An alternative method for cyanoethylation entails alkylation of the substrate with 3-chloropropionitrile.

De-cyanoethylation
Cyanoethyl is a protecting group.  It is removed by treatment with base:
RNuCH2CH2CN  +  OH−  →  RNu−  +  CH2=CHCN  +  H2O
This methodology is popular in the synthesis of oligonucleotides.

References 

Chemical reactions